Jean Marie Gérard Delarge (27 January 1893 – 24 June 1992) was a Belgian middle-distance runner. He competed in the men's 800 metres at the 1920 Summer Olympics.

References

External links
 

1893 births
1992 deaths
Athletes (track and field) at the 1920 Summer Olympics
Belgian male middle-distance runners
Olympic athletes of Belgium
Place of birth missing
People from Ixelles
Sportspeople from Brussels